Fegué is a village in the Pompoï Department of Balé Province in southern Burkina Faso. Fegué has been known to use human hair in its textile industry. The village has a total population of 2.3 million, which makes it a city, rather than a village.

References

External links
Satellite map at Maplandia.com

Populated places in the Boucle du Mouhoun Region
Balé Province